B&W, B/W or B+W may refer to:

Companies
 Babcock & Wilcox, an American manufacturing company
 Brown & Williamson, a former American tobacco company, now merged with R. J. Reynolds
 Bowers & Wilkins, a British loudspeaker company
 Bra & Wessels, a Swedish chain of department stores, since 2001 known as Coop Forum
 Burmeister & Wain, Danish ship yard and diesel engine producer
 Boeing & Westervelt, precursor company to Boeing
 B+W Filterfabrik, a photographic filter manufacturer now owned by Schneider Kreuznach

Other
 Black and white, as it refers to photography or cinematography
 Grayscale
 Power Macintosh G3 (Blue & White), a computer model made by Apple Computer
 College van Burgemeester en Wethouders, the Dutch municipal executive
 Black & White Festival, the Portuguese audiovisual festival
 b/w (meaning "backed with"), an abbreviation often used to separate the listing of the two sides of a vinyl record, especially a 45 record
 Blue and White (political alliance), a political alliance in Israel

See also
 BW (disambiguation)
 Black and white (disambiguation)
 Monochrome (disambiguation)